The Eternal City may refer to:
The city of Rome
The city of Kyoto, Japan, specifically the historical Heian-kyō, dubbed Yorozuyo no Miya (万代宮, "The Eternal City")
The Eternal City, a 1901 novel by Hall Caine
The Eternal City (1915 film), a film based on the 1901 novel
The Eternal City (1923 film), 1923 lost film directed by George Fitzmaurice based on the novel
 The Eternal City (2008 film), a 2008 film
 The Eternal City, a 2009 comic by Sergio Carrera published by Robot Comics